Monet or Monét is a given name and surname. Monet may refer to Claude Monet (1840–1926), a French impressionist painter. Notable people with the name include the following:

Given name
 Monet Hurst-Mendoza, American playwright
 Monet Mazur (born 1976), American actress
 Monét X Change (born 1990), the stage name of American drag queen Kevin Bertin.

Surname
 Akim Monet (born 1968), Swiss photographer
 Aja Monet (born 1987), American poet and writer
 Blanche Hoschedé Monet (1865–1947), French painter, stepdaughter/daughter-in-law of Claude Monet
 Camillia Monet, American actress and film producer
 Daniella Monet (born 1989), American actress, singer, and dancer
 Dominique Monet (1865–1923), Canadian politician
 Jean Monet (son of Claude Monet) (1867–1913) son of Claude Monet
 Jerzee Monét stage name of Tanisha Monét Carey (born 1977), American singer-songwriter
 Margarita Monet (born 1990), American singer
 Michel Monet (1878–1966), son of Claude Monet 
 Simonne Monet-Chartrand (1919–1993), Canadian activist
 Victoria Monét (born 1993), American singer and songwriter

See also

Manet (disambiguation)
Moneta (name)

Lists of people by surname
Lists of people by given name
Surnames from given names